Murray Mouth is the point at which the River Murray meets the Southern Ocean. The Murray Mouth's location is changeable.  Historical records show that the channel out to sea moves along the sand dunes over time.  At times of greater river flow and rough seas, the two bodies of water would erode the sand dunes to create a new channel leaving the old one to silt and disappear.

Description
The mouth divides the dune system into two peninsulas. The peninsula on the west side is Sir Richard Peninsula which terminates at the mouth with a point named Pullen Spit. The peninsula on the east side is Younghusband Peninsula which terminates at the mouth with a point known in some sources as Sleepy Hollow.

Water flows throughout the mouth from two directions.  Firstly, the flow from the west passes along a passage known as the Goolwa Channel which is bounded by Hindmarsh Island to its north side.  Secondly, the flow from the east passes along a passage known as the Coorong Channel. The Coorong Channel itself is fed by the Mundoo Channel which passes between Hindmarsh Island and Mundoo Island to the north, and by the Tauwitchere Channel to the east.

Natural history 
From the Pleistocene about 2.5 million years ago, the Murray River terminated in a freshwater lake called Lake Bungunnia which included the area now occupied by the South Australia/New South Wales border. The lake drained less than a million years ago, creating the current course.  It was suggested that the Murray may have taken a different course to the ocean, via Burra, South Australia and emptied into the Spencer Gulf, before being 'defeated' by the rise of the Mt Lofty Ranges. This has been studied by analysing the uplift date of the Mt Lofty Ranges and other geological data and found that this was not likely to be the case.

History

European discovery and use
During expeditions in 1829–30, Charles Sturt explored the Murray and its westward-flowing tributaries, finding that the mouth of the Murray was barely navigable to shipping.  During the later 19th century with the discovery of gold, and the development of sheep and wheat farming along the Murray and its tributaries, the river became a major thoroughfare for the carriage of goods and produce. During the peak period of Murray River commerce (roughly 1855 to 1920) and before the development of rail and road transport, the Murray Mouth with its complex and unpredictable interaction between shallow, shifting and variable currents and the open sea, presented a major impediment to traffic between Adelaide and the Murray settlements, and many vessels foundered or were wrecked there.

Water flow 

River Murray water is used by farmers for irrigation in four of Australia's states, as well as supplying water to most towns along the river, and many further away through various pipelines.  It has been widely accepted that too much water is being extracted; however business and political concerns make it difficult to remedy the problem.  A visible symptom of the over-extraction of river water is the closing of the Murray Mouth.

From October 2002 until 2010 dredging machines operated at the Murray Mouth.
Between 2002 and 2006, two machines operated moving sand from the channel to maintain a minimal flow from the sea and into the Coorong's lagoon system. Without the 24-hour dredging, the mouth was at risk of becoming silted and closing, cutting the supply of fresh seawater into the Coorong, which would then warm up, stagnate and die.

In mid-2006 the dredging was scaled back as a result of the improved conditions at the mouth. Now only one dredging machine operates, and permission was granted to one commercial operator to navigate the channel between Goolwa and the Coorong, passing the mouth. This operation finished in 2010.

Dredging was scheduled to resume in January 2015.

Dredging continues at a cost between $3m to $6m annually.

Protected area status and other arrangements

Australian government
The Murray Mouth is immediately adjoined on its northern and eastern sides by the boundary of the Coorong and Lakes Alexandrina and Albert Wetland Ramsar site.

South Australian government
The Murray Mouth is located within a special purpose area within the Encounter Marine Park and is immediately adjoined on its northern and eastern sides by the boundary of the Coorong National Park.

Non-statutory arrangements
The Murray Mouth is adjoined on its northern and eastern sides by the boundary of the Coorong Important Bird Area which is an area considered by Birdlife International to be a place of ‘international significance for the conservation of birds and other biodiversity.’

Citations and references

Notes

References

Further reading
 South Coast Story, John C Tolley, Rowett Print, Mt Compass SA, 1968 

Murray River
Estuaries of South Australia
Encounter Bay